Kasidol is a village in the municipality of Požarevac, Serbia. According to the 2002 census, the village has a population of 744.

Notable people 
Dragana Mirković, Serbian singer, born and raised in Kasidol

References

Populated places in Braničevo District